The Mitchell County Courthouse, built ca. 1924, is an historic 3-story redbrick Classical Revival style courthouse building located  at 349 Oak Street in Colorado City, Texas. It was designed by David S. Castle, who has been called the Architect of Abilene, and built by J.H. Reddick. It is Mitchell County's second courthouse and replaced the first courthouse built in 1883, which was torn down after it was discovered to have been built in the right-of-way of Oak Street. Sometime after 1939, the 10 windows in the portico were covered over.

See also

List of county courthouses in Texas

References

External links

Buildings and structures in Mitchell County, Texas
County courthouses in Texas
Government buildings completed in 1924
Neoclassical architecture in Texas